Xinying Station, formerly transliterated as Hsinying Station until 2003 and  Sinying from 2003 until 2009, is a railway station of the Taiwan Railways Administration West Coast line located in Xinying District, Tainan City, Taiwan.

Overview

The station has two island platforms as well as a tourist information center. It was formerly a station on the Taiwan Sugar Railways.

History 
20 May 1909: The Taiwan Sugar Railways station opens.
1934: The station was reconstructed and the second-generation station opened for service.
1 June 1960: Liuying Station opens and is under the administration of the station.
1964: The second-generation station building was expanded.
1976: The third-generation (and current) station building opened for service.
1979: The Taiwan Sugar Railways station closes.
1 June 2000: Houbi Station opens and is under the administration of the station.

Platform layout

Around the station 
 Xinying Cultural Center
 Tainan Police Department, Xinying Branch
 Xinying District Office
 Xinying Sugar Factory
 Xinying High School
 Nanguang High School
 Xingguo High School
 Xinying Senior Industrial Vocational School

See also
 List of railway stations in Taiwan

References

External links 

TRA Sinying Station 
TRA Sinying Station 

Railway stations served by Taiwan Railways Administration
Railway stations in Tainan
Railway stations opened in 1901